Invasion of Hanover may refer to:

 Invasion of Hanover (1757) by French troops following the Battle of Hastenback
 1801 invasion of Hanover by Prussian troops as part of the Second League of Armed Neutrality 
 1803 invasion of Hanover by French troops during the Napoleonic Wars
 1866 Invasion of Hanover by Prussian troops leading to it being annexed, ultimately, into the German Empire